McGee or McKee (meaning "son of Aodh") is an English language surname of Irish origin. The surname McGee was first found in along the border of counties Donegal and Tyrone (Tír Eoghain), the ancient territory of the O'Neills, now in the Province of Ulster, central Northern Ireland, where they are thought to be descended from the Colla Uais. McGee was later a chieftain clan of the Ulaid, of which their territory corresponded to the Islandmagee peninsula in modern-day County Antrim, Northern Ireland. It is also anglicised as "McCoy".

Notable people with this surname
Alan McGee, British music industry mogul and musician
American McGee, video game designer
Anita Newcomb McGee, doctor, founder of Army Nurse Corps
Arthur McGee (1933–2019), African American fashion designer
Barry McGee, artist
Bradley McGee, cyclist
Carl McGee (born 1956), American football player
Charles McGee (disambiguation), several people
Chick McGee, radio personality
Cory McGee, City councilman
Court McGee (born 1984), American mixed martial arts fighter
Debbie McGee, wife and assistant of magician Paul Daniels
Easton McGee (born 1997), American baseball player
Frank McGee (disambiguation), several people
Gale W. McGee, American politician
Haley McGee, Canadian actress
Harold McGee, cookbook author
Henry McGee (1929–2006), British actor
J. Vernon McGee, Presbyterian minister
Jack McGee (disambiguation), several people
Jake McGee (born 1986), American baseball player
James McGee (disambiguation), several people
JaVale McGee (born 1988), American basketball player
John McGee (disambiguation), several people
Kirk McGee (1899–1983), one of the McGee Brothers, an American country music duo
Kirsty McGee (born 1972), British singer-songwriter
Lewis McGee (soldier), Australian recipient of the Victoria Cross
Linda M. McGee, American judge
Luke McGee, English football 
Mary Rose McGee (1917–2004), American politician from New York
Mary McGee (boxer) (born 1986), boxer
Max McGee (1932–2007), American football player
Michael McGee (disambiguation), several people named Michael and Mike
Pamela McGee (born 1962), American basketball player; mother of JaVale
Roger McGee (1922–2013), American film actor
Sam McGee (1894-1975), one of the McGee Brothers, an American country music duo
Sears McGee (1917–2006), American judge from Texas
Stephen McGee, American football player
Suzy McGee Charnas, American novelist
Terrence McGee, American football player
Terry McGee, New Zealand-born Canadian geographer
Tony McGee, English-born fashion photographer 
Treneé McGee, American politician 
Thomas McGee (disambiguation), several people
 Thomas D'Arcy McGee, Canadian politician 
Tommy McGee (born 1979), Scottish rugby player
Trina McGee-Davis, American actress
Tyrus McGee (born 1991), American basketball player
William McGee (disambiguation), several people
Willie McGee (disambiguation), several people

Fictional
Fibber McGee, a main character in Fibber McGee and Molly
Molly McGee, a main character in Fibber McGee and Molly
Molly McGee, a main character in The Ghost and Molly McGee
Darryl McGee, Molly's brother in The Ghost and Molly McGee
Pete McGee, Molly and Darryl's father in The Ghost and Molly McGee
Sharon McGee, Molly and Darryl's mother in The Ghost and Molly McGee
Timothy McGee, a character from NCIS

See also
Magee (surname)
McGhee, surname
McGhie, surname
Gee (surname)

References

Surnames of Irish origin
Surnames of Scottish origin
Irish royal families
Anglicised Irish-language surnames